Dejan Glavnik (born 26 September 1975 in Celje, SR Slovenia, SFR Yugoslavia) is a Slovenian extreme cyclist.

Glavnik is famous for touring over 112,000 kilometres around the world by bicycle in five years. On 22 April 2006 (Earth day) Glavnik began his journey in his hometown Celje. He returned home on 23 July 2011. The 5th anniversary was celebrated in the desert Wadi Rum in Jordan, which was his 78th country to visit. He is the first Slovenian to tour the world and one of the rare people on earth to accomplish this journey on a bicycle.

Voyage 
 Celje - Nordkapp, Norway  6,457 km
 Celje - Dead horse, Prudhoe bay, Alaska  10,048 km
 Celje - Vancouver, BC  14,700 km
 Celje - Cancun, Mexico  23,712 km
 Celje - Santo Domingo  25,420 km
 Celje - Copan, Honduras  30,210 km
 Celje - Liberia, Costa Rica  32,000 km (first year)
 Celje - Lima, (Peru)  40,665 km
 Celje - Buenos Aires (Argentina)  48,465 km
 Celje - Ushuaia (Argentina) 53,117 km
 Celje - Christchurch (New Zealand) 55,367 km
 Celja - Hobart (Tasmania) 56,105 km
 Celje - Darwin (Australia) 60,093 km
 Celje - Sandakan (Malesia) 63,309 km
 Celje - Manila (Philippines) 65,184 km
 Celje - Beijing (China) 66,614 km
 Celje - Ulaanbaatar (Mongolia) 68,088 km
 Celje - Busan (South Korea) 69,442 km
 Celje - Tokio (Japan) 70,902 km
 Celje - Zamboanga (Mindanao, Philippines) 72,267 km
 Celje - Kota Kinabalu (Sabah, Malesia) 72,840 km
 Celje - Bandar Seri Begawan (Brunei) 73,307 km
 Celje - Pontianak (West Kalimantan, Indonesia) 74,785 km
 Celje - Kuta (Bali, Indonesia) 76,236 km
 Celje - Singapore (Singapore) 77,972 km
 Celje - Bangkok (Thailand) 80,181 km
 Celje - Phnom Pehn (Cambodia) 81,147 km
 Celje - Sepon (Laos) 82,304 km
 Celje - Sapa (Vietnam) 83,837 km
 Celje - Jol (Yanjing) Tibet (China) 85,729 km
 Celje - Birganj (Nepal) 87,119 km
 Celje - Amritsar (India) 91,805 km
 Celje - Quetta (Pakistan) 93,086 km
 Celje - Bandar Abbas (Iran) 94,719 km
 Celje - Muscat (Oman) 95,280 km
 Celje - Maun (Botswana)  97,380 km
 Celje - Uis (Namibia)  100,283 km
 Celje - Livingstone (Zambia) 102,393 km
 Celje - Mbeya (Tanzania) 104,268 km
 Celje - Nairobi (Kenya) 106,207 km
 Celje - Kampala (Uganda) 107,172 km
 Celje - Khartoum (Sudan) 109,127 km
 Celje - Cairo (Egypt) 111,569 km
 Celje - Aqaba (Jordan) 112,224 km (5 years on the journey)

References

External links 
 Official website

1975 births
Living people
Slovenian photographers
Slovenian travel writers
Slovenian male cyclists
Sportspeople from Celje
Writers from Celje